Two Tigers can refer to:

 Two Tigers (nursery rhyme) a Mandarin Chinese nursery rhyme
 When two tigers fight, a Chinese proverb
 Two Tigers (film), a 2006 action film
 The Two Tigers, a novel in the Sandokan series by Emilio Salgari
 Two Tigers (video game), a 1984 arcade game from Bally Midway